Arthur Davis (6 November 1898 – 5 March 1943) was an Australian cricketer. He played two first-class matches for Tasmania between 1924 and 1926.

See also
 List of Tasmanian representative cricketers

References

External links
 

1898 births
1943 deaths
Australian cricketers
Tasmania cricketers
Cricketers from Launceston, Tasmania